Tim Dorning (born 18 March 1956) is a sailor from Australia, who represented his country at the 1984 Summer Olympics in Los Angeles, United States as crew member in the Soling. With helmsman Gary Sheard and fellow crew member Dean Gordon they took 7th place.

References

Living people
1956 births
Sailors at the 1984 Summer Olympics – Soling
Sailors at the 1992 Summer Olympics – Soling
Olympic sailors of Australia
Australian male sailors (sport)
20th-century Australian people